is a Japanese surname meaning "crossroads". Notable people with the surname include:

Arts
 Ayano Tsuji (born 1978), a Japanese pop singer
 Ayumi Tsuji (born 1984), a Japanese voice actress from Ehime Prefecture 
 Daisuke Tsuji (born 1982), Japanese-American actor
 Hitonari Tsuji (born 1959), a Japanese novelist, composer, and film director (also known as Jinsei Tsuji)
 Jun Tsuji (1884–1944), a Japanese poet, essayist, and playwright
 Kazuhiro Tsuji, former name of Kazu Hiro, American special effects make-up artist
 Kunio Tsuji (1925–1999), a Japanese novelist and scholar of French literature
 Masaki Tsuji (born 1932), a Japanese anime scenario writer and mystery novelist
 Nozomi Tsuji (born 1987), a Japanese pop singer
 Shion Tsuji (born 1990), a Japanese singer-songwriter best known for her song "Sky Chord (Otona ni Naru Kimi e)"

Sports
 Chie Tsuji (born 1969), a Japanese volleyball player
 Hatsuhiko Tsuji (born 1958), a Japanese baseball player
 Naoto Tsuji (born 1989), a Japanese basketball player
, Japanese footballer

Other
, Japanese politician
 Masanobu Tsuji (1901–1968), a 20th-century Japanese army officer and war criminal
 Shintaro Tsuji (born 1927), founder of the Japanese company Sanrio
 Yasuhiro Tsuji (born 1955), a Japanese politician of the Democratic Party of Japan who served two terms in the National Diet
, Japanese professional wrestler
 Jiro Tsuji, a Japanese chemist who pioneered the Tsuji–Trost reaction
 Ryuu Tsuji, a fictional character from S · A: Special A

References

Japanese-language surnames